Spies and Lies is a 1992 Nancy Drew and the Hardy Boys Supermystery crossover novel. It was written by Tracey West under the usual pseudonym Carolyn Keene.

Plot
Nancy Drew goes undercover as a rookie in the infamous Quantico, Virginia FBI Academy, serving Judy Noll, the daughter of a powerful political figure. Judy is immediately in danger when her roommate turns up dead, and also when she is revealed to be the target of a madman. Nancy lays herself a trap, with herself as the bait. The Hardys are also posing as trainees at the bureau, but undercover, trying to foil a scheme involving a corporate rivalry, a twisted plot, an FBI double agent, a stained integrity, and a murderer bent on destruction.

References

External links
Supermystery series books

Supermystery
1992 American novels
1992 children's books
Novels set in Virginia
Prince William County, Virginia